Consort Lu (2 March 1841 – 15 May 1895), of the Manchu Yehe Nara clan belonging to Plain White Banner, was a consort of Xianfeng Emperor.

Life

Family background 
Consort Lu came from a powerful Manchu Yehe Nara clan belonging to Plain White Banner. Her personal name was Mudanchun (牡丹春, literally: Spring Peony).

 Father: Quanwen (全文), served as sixth rank literary official (主事).

Daoguang era 
The future Consort Lu was born on 2 March 1841.

Xianfeng era 
Lady Yehe Nara entered Forbidden City in 1855, and was given the title of "Noble Lady Lu" (璷贵人; "lu" meaning "exquisite"). Noble Lady Lu remained childless during Xianfeng era. She lived in Chuxiu palace together with Empress Dowager Cixi. She was a member of a clique called "Four Spring Ladies" (四春娘娘) together with Noble Lady Xi, Noble Lady Ji, and Noble Lady Qing.

Tongzhi era 
In 1861, Noble Lady Lu was promoted to "Concubine Lu" (璷嫔) according to the imperial tradition. In 1874, she was elevated to "Consort Lu" (璷妃).

Guangxu era 
On 2 March 1891, Lady Yehe Nara  celebrated her 50th birthday (千秋; one thousand autumns). Consort Lu received 5 rolls of lotus root xiaojuan silk thread, 5 rolls of white moon xiaojuan silk thread, 5 rolls of grey xiaojuan silk and satin, 5 rolls of golden yellow xiaojuan silk and satin, 5 rolls of blue crepe and jiang soy sauce (brown) gauze. She was supposed to be promoted to Noble Consort, but died from illness on 15 May 1895.

Titles 
 During the reign of the Daoguang Emperor (r. 1820–1850):
 Lady Yehe Nara (from 2 March 1841)
 During the reign of the Xianfeng Emperor (r. 1850–1861):
 Noble Lady Lu (from 1855), sixth rank consort 
 During the reign of the Tongzhi Emperor (r. 1861–1875):
 Concubine Lu (from 1861) fifth rank consort 
 Consort Lu (from 1874), fourth rank consort

See also
 Ranks of imperial consorts in China#Qing
 Royal and noble ranks of the Qing dynasty

References

1841 births
1895 deaths
Manchu people
19th-century Chinese women
19th-century Chinese people
Consorts of the Xianfeng Emperor